Ringlet is the southernmost town of the Cameron Highlands, Pahang, Malaysia, and the first town of Cameron Highlands on the road from Tapah. It is a hub of Malaysia's vegetable farming and international flower farming sector. It is a small hill resort located at an altitude of 1135 meters above sea level (3723 feet) which contains some other small villages such as Bertam Valley, Boh and Habu Height. SJK (T) Ringlet, SJK (C) Cameron, SJK (C) Bertam Valley and SMK Ringlet that are located near Ringlet. There is a highway that connects this town to Kuantan.

References

Cameron Highlands
Towns in Pahang